

36001–36100 

|-id=033
| 36033 Viseggi ||  || Mount Viseggi in Italy, on top of which the discovering Monte Viseggi Observatory  is located. || 
|-id=035
| 36035 Petrvok || 1999 PV || Peter Vok of Rosenberg (1539–1611), a Czech nobleman and the last member of the medieval South Bohemian Rosenberg family || 
|-id=036
| 36036 Bonucci ||  || Arturo Bonucci (1954–2002), an Italian cellist and amateur astrophotographer || 
|-id=037
| 36037 Linenschmidt ||  || Robb Linenschmidt (1970–1993), American aerospace engineer and friend of the discoverers, Dan Bruton and Carlton F. Stewart || 
|-id=060
| 36060 Babuška ||  || Ivo Babuška (born 1926), Czech-American mathematician, founder of the journal Applications of Mathematics, honorary member of the Czech Learned Society || 
|-id=061
| 36061 Haldane ||  || J. B. S. Haldane (1892–1964), British biologist and philosopher of science || 
|}

36101–36200 

|-id=169
| 36169 Grosseteste ||  || Robert Grosseteste, an English statesman, natural philosopher and theologian. || 
|-id=177
| 36177 Tonysharon ||  || Anthony P. Sharon, Deputy Executive Vice President of MIT. || 
|-id=182
| 36182 Montigiani ||  || Montigiani Roberto, Italian amateur astronomer and friend of the discoverer || 
|-id=184
| 36184 Pavelbožek ||  || Pavel Božek (born 1958) is a respected surgeon from Břeclav, Czech Republic. He is interested in astronomy and cosmonautics. || 
|-id=187
| 36187 Travisbarman ||  || Travis Barman, assistant astronomer at Lowell Observatory || 
|}

36201–36300 

|-id=213
| 36213 Robertotisgreen ||  || Robert Otis Green (born 1960) has provided leadership and expertise in imaging spectroscopy for Earth and Planetary Science since joining the JPL in 1983. His knowledge of phenomenology and instrumentation is deep and broad, his science is first class, and his passion for discovery is infectious. || 
|-id=226
| 36226 Mackerras ||  || Sir Charles Mackerras, Australian-American orchestra conductor || 
|-id=235
| 36235 Sergebaudo || 1999 VJ || Serge Baudo, French orchestra conductor || 
|-id=264
| 36264 Kojimatsumoto ||  || Koji Matsumoto (born 1968) is a Japanese planetary geodesist. He has contributed to the SELENE mission analysis of the lunar gravity field and to the Hayabusa2 mission analysis of the spacecraft trajectory using LIDAR data. || 
|}

36301–36400 

|-id=329
| 36329 Philmetzger ||  || Philip Metzger (born 1962) is an Associate Scientist at the Florida Space Institute (Orlando, Florida) and a leader in the study of the mechanical properties of Lunar and asteroid regoliths including how rocket exhaust interacts with regolith and requirements to protect Apollo sites from damage. || 
|-id=340
| 36340 Vaduvescu ||  || Ovidiu Vaduvescu (born 1967) is a Romanian astronomer at ING (La Palma, Spain) whose career has spanned several countries. A dedicated observer, he has worked on near-Earth asteroids and dwarf galaxies. Many students and amateur astronomers have benefited from his teaching skills. || 
|-id=352
| 36352 Erickmeza ||  || Erick Meza (born 1980) is the principal researcher for a new 1-m telescope at the Peruvian Space Agency, CONIDA (Moquegua, Peru).  His work includes telescope commissioning, astrometry for stellar occultation predictions, and studying Pluto's atmosphere. || 
|}

36401–36500 

|-id=424
| 36424 Satokokumasaki ||  || Satoko Kumasaki (born 1958) has devoted herself to elementary education since 1992. She organized the Primary Education Study Group at the Kawai Institute for Culture and Education. || 
|-id=426
| 36426 Kakuda ||  || Kakuda is a city in Miyagi Prefecture, Japan || 
|-id=444
| 36444 Clairblackburn ||  || Clair Blackburn (1940–2018) was a tireless and infectiously positive force for astronomy education and outreach in Tonopah, Nevada. He was an early adopter and supporter of the Research and Education Collaborative Occultation Network. || 
|-id=445
| 36445 Smalley || 2000 QU || Kyle Smalley, American amateur astronomer and team member of the Powell Observatory Near-Earth-Object follow-up program || 
|-id=446
| 36446 Cinodapistoia || 2000 QV || Cino da Pistoia (Guittoncino dei Sinibaldi or Sighibuldi), mediaeval Tuscan jurist and poet, friend of Dante Alighieri and Francesco Petrarch || 
|-id=472
| 36472 Ebina ||  || Ebina, a town in central Kanagawa Prefecture. || 
|}

36501–36600 

|-bgcolor=#f2f2f2
| colspan=4 align=center | 
|}

36601–36700 

|-id=614
| 36614 Saltis ||  || Saltis, a nickname for the discovering Stockholm Observatory at Saltsjöbaden, Sweden || 
|-id=672
| 36672 Sidi ||  || Sidonie Adlersburg (1933–1943), an Austrian Roma victim of Auschwitz, memorialized in Erich Hackl's novel Abschied von Sidonie || 
|}

36701–36800 

|-id=773
| 36773 Tuttlekeane ||  || James Tuttle Keane (born 1987) is a postdoctoral researcher at the California Institute of Technology studying the tidal evolution of solar system planets, satellites, and small bodies, who also has a talent for clear illustration of planetary processes. || 
|-id=774
| 36774 Kuittinen ||  || Risto Kuittinen, Director General of the Finnish Geodetic Institute during 1998–2011 || 
|-id=782
| 36782 Okauchitakashige ||  || Takashige Okauchi (born 1938) contributed to the recovery and investigation of the meteorite "Kokubunji Inseki". He participated in the activities of the Japan Spaceguard Association, such as "Spaceguard Tanteidan". || 
|-id=783
| 36783 Kagamino ||  || Kagamino Town is in the northern part of Okayama Prefecture in Japan.  || 
|-id=800
| 36800 Katarinawitt ||  || Katarina Witt, German figure skater, olympic champion, four-time World Figure Skating champion, German "Ice Skater of the Century" || 
|}

36801–36900 

|-id=888
| 36888 Škrabal ||  || Emil Škrabal, Czech construction engineer and amateur astronomer, member of the Czech Society for Interplanetary Matter and an honorary member of the Czech Astronomical Society || 
|}

36901–37000 

|-id=983
| 36983 Sumner ||  || James Edward (Red) Sumner Jr. (born 1948) has distinguished himself as a stellar occultation observer. In particular, he has provided essential education and outreach support for the Research and Education Collaborative Occultation Network. || 
|-id=986
| 36986 Stickle ||  || Angela M. Stickle (born 1984) is a planetary scientist at Johns Hopkins University Applied Physics Laboratory. Dr. Stickle specializes in impact physics and kinetic asteroid deflection. || 
|}

References 

036001-037000